James Bruce Stalzer (born July 7, 1946) is an American politician. A member of the Republican Party, he has been an member of the South Dakota Senate, representing District 11 since 2017. He was previously a member of the South Dakota House of Representatives, representing District 11 from 2013 to 2017.

Elections

South Dakota House of Representatives
In 2012, when incumbent Republican Representative Lora Hubbel ran for South Dakota Senate and left a District 11 seat open, Stalzer ran in the four-way June 5, 2012 Republican Primary and placed second with 447 votes ahead of incumbent Representative Mark Willadsen; in the four-way November 6, 2012 General election, fellow Republican nominee Christine Erickson took the first seat and Stalzer took the second seat with 5,124 votes (27.88%) ahead of Democratic former Representative Darrell Solberg and Jim Larson, who had run for the seat in 2010.

South Dakota state senate

In 2016, Stalzer ran for the South Dakota Senate District 11 seat, after incumbent David Omdahl decided not to run for a second term. Stalzer was unopposed in the Republican primary, as was his Democratic counterpart, Tom Cool. Stalzer defeated Cool with 6,944 votes (60.78%) to 4,481 votes (39.22%). In 2018, Stalzer defeated Kevin Elsing with 6,190 votes (60.4%) to 4,058 votes (39.6%).

Criticism
In 2015, the police of Sioux Falls demanded Stalzer to apologize after he made controversial remarks regarding concealed weapons. Stalzer's answer to the demand was that he made a comparison between honesty and integrity of concealed weapons and their holders, and therefore he has nothing to apologize about.

References

External links
 

Place of birth missing (living people)
Living people
Republican Party South Dakota state senators
Republican Party members of the South Dakota House of Representatives
Politicians from Sioux Falls, South Dakota
1946 births
21st-century American politicians